Thaddeus Gibson (born October 21, 1987) is a former American football defensive end. He was drafted by the Pittsburgh Steelers in the fourth round of the 2010 NFL Draft. He played college football at Ohio State.

He has also played for the San Francisco 49ers, Chicago Bears, Tennessee Titans, Dallas Cowboys, and Toronto Argonauts.

Early years
Gibson attended Euclid High School in Euclid, Ohio, where he had 50 tackles, 17 sacks, 22 QB hurries, and two interceptions as a junior. In his senior year, he collected 39 total tackles, 10 quarterback sacks and eight tackles behind the line of scrimmage.

Considered a four-star recruit by Rivals.com, Gibson was listed the No. 9 outside linebacker prospect in the nation. He chose Ohio State over Michigan and Tennessee.

College career

After redshirting his initial year at Ohio State, Gibson was part of three special teams units in 2007. He recorded 11 tackles, including 3 for a loss of yardage, as well as a quarterback sack and a forced fumble over the course of the season.

In his sophomore season, Gibson earned a place in the starting lineup at defensive end. He compiled 26 tackles, 9 tackles for a loss, and 5 sacks for the year.

Professional career

Pittsburgh Steelers
Gibson was drafted with the fourth round pick of the Pittsburgh Steelers, 116th overall in the 2010 NFL Draft.  Gibson appeared in two games before being waived on the Steelers' bye week.

San Francisco 49ers
On November 1, 2010, Gibson was claimed off waivers by the San Francisco 49ers.  He played two games with the 49ers and recorded two tackles and one forced fumble on special teams.  Gibson was released by the 49ers prior to the 2011 season, on August 15.

Chicago Bears
Gibson was signed by the Chicago Bears on November 30, 2011, where he appeared in two games.  On August 26, 2012, the Bears released Gibson.

Tennessee Titans
On October 17, 2012, the Tennessee Titans signed Gibson to the practice squad. On December 31, 2012, the Titans signed Gibson to a reserve/future contract. On August 11, 2013, he was waived by the Titans.

Dallas Cowboys
On August 13, 2013, Gibson was claimed off waivers by the Dallas Cowboys. On August 31, 2013, he was released by the Cowboys.

Toronto Argonauts
On May 7, 2014, Gibson signed with the Toronto Argonauts of the Canadian Football League.

Winnipeg Blue Bombers
On September 2, 2014, Gibson was traded to the Winnipeg Blue Bombers in exchange for defensive back Alex Suber.

References

External links
Pittsburgh Steelers bio
Winnipeg Blue Bombers bio 
Ohio State Buckeyes bio

1987 births
Living people
People from Euclid, Ohio
Players of American football from Ohio
African-American players of American football
American football defensive ends
American football linebackers
Ohio State Buckeyes football players
Pittsburgh Steelers players
San Francisco 49ers players
Washington Redskins players
Chicago Bears players
Tennessee Titans players
Dallas Cowboys players
Sportspeople from Cuyahoga County, Ohio
Winnipeg Blue Bombers players
Toronto Argonauts players
Canadian football defensive linemen
21st-century African-American sportspeople
20th-century African-American people